Khamis Abdullah Saifeldin (born 1 February 1976) is a Qatari runner who specialized in the 3000 metre steeplechase. He is of Sudanese descent. He represented Sudan at the 1996 Summer Olympics and Qatar at the 2000 Summer Olympics and the 2004 Summer Olympics.

In addition he has medals from the Asian Athletics Championships, the Gulf Cooperation Council Championships, the West Asian Games and the Arab Athletics Championships.

International competitions

Personal bests
1500 metres - 3:44.26 min (2004)
3000 metres - 8:04.41 min (1999)
3000 metre steeplechase - 8:13.45 min (2002)
5000 metres - 13:36.93 min (1999)

References

External links

1976 births
Living people
Qatari male steeplechase runners
Qatari male long-distance runners
Sudanese male middle-distance runners
Sudanese male long-distance runners
Qatari male middle-distance runners
Olympic athletes of Sudan
Olympic athletes of Qatar
Athletes (track and field) at the 1996 Summer Olympics
Athletes (track and field) at the 2000 Summer Olympics
Athletes (track and field) at the 2004 Summer Olympics
Asian Games gold medalists for Qatar
Asian Games medalists in athletics (track and field)
Athletes (track and field) at the 2002 Asian Games
World Athletics Championships athletes for Qatar
Qatari people of Sudanese descent
Sudanese emigrants to Qatar
Naturalised citizens of Qatar
Universiade medalists in athletics (track and field)
Medalists at the 2002 Asian Games
Universiade medalists for Qatar